Davanagere is a city in the centre of the southern Indian state of Karnataka. It is the seventh largest city in the state, and the administrative headquarters of eponymous Davangere district. Hitherto being a cotton hub and hence popularly known before as the Manchester of Karnataka, the commercial ventures of the city is now dominated by education and agro-processing industries. Davanagere became a separate district in 1997, when it was separated from the erstwhile undivided district of Chitradurga for administration conveniences. Davanagere is known for rich culinary traditions which encompass the diversity of entire Karnataka's dishes due to its geographical position in the state as its centre. Notable among them is its aromatic benne dosey/butter Dosa that is associated with the name of the city.

Davanagere was selected as one of the hundred Indian cities to be developed as a smart city under Central government's Smart Cities Mission. It was among the first 20 towns to be developed under the mission by Ministry of Urban Development. According to 2020 human living index, it was selected as the top 9th most livable city under 10 million population in India.

Civic administration

Davangere has been a pioneer in municipal administration with the city attaining the status of a municipality as early as 1870. The Imperial Gazetteer of India (1911) says that the receipts and expenditure of the municipality, during the ten years ending 1901, averaged Rs 14,200 and Rs 12,600 respectively. The civic administration of the city was managed by the Nagarasabhe, before it was established as a municipality on 7 August 1951. It now has the status of a City Corporation, which was upgraded on 6 January 2007. It is headed by a Mayor, assisted by Commissioners and council members. The city is divided into 45 wards, and the council members (corporators) are elected by the people of the city.

Geography
Davanagere is the "Heart of Karnataka". Davanagere is surrounded from Chitradurga, Vijayanagara, Shimoga, Chikmagalur and Haveri districts.

Davanagere lies in the semi arid region. The district is bounded by Shimoga (Malenadu) Area of Hills, Haveri, Chitradurga, Chikmagalur and Vijayanagara districts. The southern and western parts of the district are irrigated by the waters of the Bhadra reservoir. It has the Asia's 2nd largest irrigation tank called Sulekere (shanthi sagara) which is a major water source for farmers in the district.

Demographics
 census, Davanagere city had a population of 435,125. Males constitute 52% of the population, and females 48%. Davanagere has an average literacy rate of 85%, higher than the national average of 74.04%: male literacy is 89% and, female literacy is 81%. In Davanagere, 12% of the population is under 6 years of age.

Transportation 
Davangere is well-connected by road to Bangalore,  Chitradurga, Dharwad, Pune, Goa, Mangalore, Mysore and Chennai through NH 48 (previously National Highway 4). Karnataka State Road Transport Corporation, has a divisional office situated in Davanagere City. The city is well-connected to Bengaluru and other cities in the state by KSRTC buses. Many privately operated buses offer overnight services to other places within the state. 

The city's railway station comes under South Western Railway zone and was constructed during the British period and has been renovated recently. The station code is DVG. The railway station is quite conveniently located in the centre of the city. Regular train services are available to travel towards Bengaluru, Hubli and Mysore.

The ubiquitous Autorickshaws are the backbone for travelling within the city. The city bus services are operated by both private as well as state owned buses.

Gallery

See also 
 Shamanur
 Benne dose

References 

 
Smart cities in India
Cities and towns in Davanagere district
Cities in Karnataka